North Armagh may refer to:

The northern part of County Armagh
North Armagh (Northern Ireland Parliament constituency)
North Armagh (UK Parliament constituency)